Amit Prabhakar Maydeo, is an Indian Gastroenterologist and endoscopy expert, known for his pioneering efforts on therapeutic endoscopy and endoscopic retrograde cholangiopancreatography (ERCP). He was honoured by the Government of India, in 2013, by bestowing on him the Padma Shri, the fourth highest civilian award, for his contributions to the fields of medicine and medical education. His son, Dr. Rohan Maydeo is a surgeon from MGM Medical College and Hospital, Aurangabad.

Biography

Amit Prabhakar Maydeo was born in a family with meagre financial resources in Girgaon, a southern Mumbai area in the western Indian state of Maharashtra. After graduating in medicine, his initial specialization was in surgery, but an internship at a German Hospital introduced him to the minimally invasive technique of endoscopy.

Maydeo is credited with the establishment of the first endoscopic centre in India, Baldota Institute of Digestive Sciences, considered as the most modern gastroenterology and endoscopic centre in India where he works in the capacity of the Director. Reports credit him with introducing the concept of endoscopy in India and starting the first educational course on the topic. He is also reported to have done path breaking work on therapeutic endoscopy and endoscopic retrograde cholangiopancreatography (ERCP). His researches have also been quoted to have developed new protocols in the treatment of pancreatic and common bile duct (CBD) stones.

Amit Maydeo, a recipient of the civilian award of Padma Shri, lives along the Bhulabhai Desai Road, popularly known as Breach Candy, in Mumbai.

Positions
Amit Prabhakar Maydeo, a former President of the Society of Gastrointestinal Endoscopy of India, is the Managing Director of the Institute of Advanced Endoscopy, he also holds positions of prominence such as:
 Director - Baldota Institute of Digestive Sciences, Global Hospital, Mumbai
 Consultant, Gastroenterologist - Breach Candy Hospital, Mumbai
 Honorary Consultant Gastroenterologist - Jaslok Hospital, Mumbai
 Consultant Gastroenterologist - Prince Aly Khan Hospital, Mumbai

Maydeo is also connected with two firms, Elcom Instruments Industries and Centre for Digestive and Kidney Diseases India, in the capacity of the Director.

See also
 Endoscopic retrograde cholangiopancreatography

References

External links
 
Dr Amit maydeo/ verified gastroenterologist information at Gastro Doctor India.

Living people
Recipients of the Padma Shri in medicine
Indian gastroenterologists
Medical doctors from Mumbai
20th-century Indian medical doctors
Year of birth missing (living people)